Kirill Sergeyevich Kochkayev (born 10 June 1984) is a former Russian professional footballer.

Club career
He played 5 seasons in the Russian Football National League for FC Lokomotiv Chita and FC Chkalovets-1936 Novosibirsk before moving to the Kazakhstan Premier League for the next 3 seasons.

External links
 
 

1984 births
People from Krasnokamensky District
Living people
Russian footballers
Association football forwards
FC Sibir Novosibirsk players
FC Atyrau players
FC Gornyak Uchaly players
Kazakhstan Premier League players
Russian expatriate footballers
Expatriate footballers in Kazakhstan
Russian expatriate sportspeople in Kazakhstan
FC Chita players
Sportspeople from Zabaykalsky Krai